The Eagle of Saladin known in Egypt as the Egyptian Eagle,  and the Republican Eagle, is a heraldic eagle that serves as the coat of arms of many countries; coat of arms of Egypt, Iraq, Palestine, and of the Southern Transitional Council of South Yemen. Since the Egyptian Revolution of 1952, the eagle has been an iconic symbol of Egypt, and of Arab nationalism, particularly in Arab states that underwent anti-imperialist political change from the 1950s onwards. It was formerly the national symbol of the now defunct United Arab Republic, North Yemen, South Yemen, and the Libyan Arab Republic.

Origin of the eagle

Inspired by the ancient eagle depicted on Egyptians temples from the Pharaonic era, Saladin, the first Sultan of Egypt, took the animal as a symbol of strength, and carried a yellow flag emblazoned with an eagle as his personal standard. The Cairo Citadel, built during Saladin's reign, has a large eagle on its west wall believed to depict Saladin's emblem. Speculated by the Ottoman explorer Evliya Çelebi to have originally been double-headed, the eagle on the Citadel wall is today headless. The course lines on the eagle do not correspond with those on the wall, suggesting that it was moved to its present location substantially after Saladin's rule, possibly during the rule of Muhammad Ali, when the upper part of the wall was rebuilt. The double-headed eagle symbol was used on coins of al-Adil I, Saladin's brother who succeeded him as Sultan.

Modern history

The Egyptian Revolution of 1952 was characterised by a profound reassertion of Egyptian nationalism, and later the regional Arab nationalism under Gamal Abdel Nasser's rule, the latter particularly in the context of the Arab-Israeli conflict. Drawing direct parallels between this conflict and the Crusades, the leaders of Egypt's revolution connected their own declared efforts of Arab liberation with those of the medieval Saladin who, as Egypt's sultan, had united Arab forces against the Crusaders in Palestine. Simultaneously, Egypt's revolutionary government under Muhammad Naguib and Gamal Abdel Nasser, both veterans of the Palestine War, introduced the Arab Liberation Flag bearing the colours of red, white, black, and green associated with the Rashidun Caliphate of Medina, the Umayyad Caliphate of Damascus, the Abbasid Caliphate of Baghdad, and Egypt's own Fatimad Caliphate of Cairo. In the centre of the flag, they placed the Eagle of Saladin, rendered in gold. Henceforth, both the Eagle of Saladin and the Arab Liberation Flag would become symbols linked inextricably with republican Egypt, and the wider cause of Arab nationalism.

When Egypt united with Syria in 1958 to form the United Arab Republic, the Eagle of Saladin became the new state's coat of arms, whilst the Arab Liberation Flag was taken as the basis for the flag.

Even though the Egyptian-Syrian union ended abruptly in 1961 after a coup d'état in Syria, the Eagle remained a potent symbol for those aspiring for Arab unity. Following the toppling of the monarchy of North Yemen in 1962, the Eagle became the national symbol of the new Yemen Arab Republic, and later of the People's Democratic Republic of Yemen in South Yemen in 1967. Likewise, Iraq's 1963 Ramadan Revolution by the Arab Socialist Ba'ath Party led to Iraq also adopting the Eagle as Iraq's coat of arms of Iraq. Conversely, the Libyan Arab Republic adopted the Eagle in 1969, however, it was later supplanted by the Hawk of Quraish when, along with Egypt, and Syria, Libya established the Federation of Arab Republics in 1972.

The State of Palestine was the most recent state to adopt the Eagle of Saladin, doing so upon its declaration of statehood in 1988.

Current national emblems using the Eagle of Saladin

See also

Coat of arms of Egypt
Coat of arms of Iraq
Coat of arms of Palestine
Coat of arms of the United Arab Republic
Coat of arms of Yemen
Coat of arms of Libya 
Hawk of Quraish
Double-headed eagle

References

External links
The emblem of Egypt's flag, A.R.E. - The Golden Eagle of Egypt, Flags of the World (website)

Saladin
Cairo
Egyptian culture
Heraldic eagles
Fauna of Egypt
1952 in Egypt
Egyptian Revolution of 1952
National symbols
National symbols of Egypt
National symbols of Iraq
National symbols of the State of Palestine
National symbols of Yemen